The 2006 SWAC men's basketball tournament was held March 9–11, 2006, at Bill Harris Arena in Birmingham, Alabama.  defeated , 57–44 in the championship game. The Jaguars received the conference's automatic bid to the 2006 NCAA tournament as No. 16 seed in the Atlanta Region.

Bracket and results

References

2005–06 Southwestern Athletic Conference men's basketball season
SWAC men's basketball tournament